Andorra competed at the 2019 European Games in Minsk from 21 to 30 June 2019. Andorra was represented by 12 athletes in 5 sports.

Competitors

Basketball 3x3

Team roster

Men
Alexis Bartolome
Oriol Fernandez
Cinto Gabriel
Hugo Schneider

Summary

Team roster

Women
Cristina Andres
Claudia Brunet
Anna Mana
Alba Pla

Summary

Cycling

Road

Judo

Men

Karate

Kata

Shooting

References 

Nations at the 2019 European Games
European Games
2019